Charles Garnier (9 October 1887 – 21 December 1963) was a French rower. He competed in the men's coxed four, inriggers event at the 1912 Summer Olympics.

References

1887 births
1963 deaths
French male rowers
Olympic rowers of France
Rowers at the 1912 Summer Olympics
Sportspeople from Nogent-sur-Marne